At the 1908 Summer Olympics, five boxing events were contested. All of the boxing was conducted on 27 October. The event was held in the Northampton Institute in Clerkenwell, East London.

There were three rounds in each bout, with the first two rounds being three minutes long and the last one going four minutes. Two judges scored the match, giving 5 points to the better boxer in each of the first two rounds and 7 to the better boxer in the third round. Marks were given to the other boxer in proportion to how well he did compared to the better. If the judges were not agreed on a winner at the end of the bout, the referee could either choose the winner or order a fourth round.

Medal summary

Participating nations
A total of 42 boxers from 4 nations competed at the London Games:

Medal table

References

External links
 International Olympic Committee medal database
 Official Report of the Games of the IV Olympiad (1908).
 De Wael, Herman. Herman's Full Olympians: "Boxing 1908". Accessed 8 April 2006.

 
1908 in boxing
1908
1908 Summer Olympics events
International boxing competitions hosted by the United Kingdom